Frederico is a given name. It is a form of Frederick, most commonly found in Portuguese.

Literature
 Frederico Barbosa, Brazilian poet
 Frederico Ghisliero, Italian fencer and soldier who wrote his text Regole di molte cavagliereschi essercitii

Sports
 Frederico Gil, Portuguese tennis player
Frederico Morais, Portuguese surfer
 Frederico Chaves Guedes, Brazilian footballer
 Frederico Rodrigues Santos, Brazilian footballer
 Frederico Rosa, Portuguese footballer
 Frederico Ferreira Silva, Portuguese tennis player
 Frederico Viegas, Professional race car driver born in Portugal on October 25, 1974
 Helbert Frederico Carreiro da Silva, Brazilian footballer
 Paulo Frederico Benevenute, Brazilian footballer

See also
 Federico
 Fred (disambiguation)
 Freddie (disambiguation)
 Freddo
 Freddy (disambiguation)
 Frédéric
 Frederick (given name)
 Fredrik
 Fredro
 Friedrich (disambiguation)
 Fryderyk (disambiguation)

Portuguese masculine given names